A320 Airbus is an amateur flight simulation video game released in 1991 in which the player pilots an Airbus A320. The game was developed over three years with cooperation from Lufthansa, Deutsche Airbus, and Jeppesen. The game was written by Rainer Bopf for the Amiga and converted to the Atari ST by Christian Jungen. The most recent version of the game is 1.44.

In 1993, Thalion published two data disks which could be played as a separate game. They were based on the latest version of the game engine. They focused on different flying areas. Europe Edition covered the area of Europe and USA Edition covered the area of USA. In the latter player was able to choose the region of West Coast USA or North East USA.

In 1995, Games 4 Europe published an official sequel called A320 Airbus Vol. 2. It was entirely written by Rainer Bopf with no additional help from third parties.

References

External links
A320 Airbus at Lemon Amiga
A320 Airbus at Atari Mania

1991 video games
Airbus A320 family
Amiga games
Atari ST games
DOS games
General flight simulators
Single-player video games
Thalion Software games
Video games developed in Germany